Events from the year 2010 in Denmark.

Incumbents
 Monarch – Margrethe II
 Prime minister – Lars Løkke Rasmussen

Events

January

 1 January – A Somali man is charged with trying to kill Kurt Westergaard, whose drawing of the Prophet Mohammed has sparked riots around the world.

February

 5 February – Danish special forces storm a ship captured by armed Somali pirates and free the 25 crew on board.
 13 February – Three people die and others are seriously injured after a Danish bus en route from Berlin to Munich hits a barrier and flips over on the Bundesautobahn 9 near Dessau, Saxony-Anhalt. The Autobahn is closed in both directions.

March

 19 March – For the second year in a row Denmark is revealed as the most wasteful nation in the European Union.
 29 March – Ministers from the Arctic countries – Russia, Denmark, Norway, Canada and the United States – meet in Chelsea, Quebec, to form a working cooperation over the North Pole region.

April

 15 April – The Foreign Ministry decides to shut its embassies in Jordan, Algeria, Bosnia and Herzegovina, and Nicaragua, as well as the general consulate in Hong Kong.

May

 3 May – Nearly ten years after its opening, the 50 millionth vehicle roars over the Øresund Bridge.
 4 May – The army announces that 11 Danish soldiers were wounded when their patrol base in Afghanistan came under attack. Two local interpreters were also injured in the incident.
 9 May – Danish chef Rasmus Kofoed wins Bocuse d'Or.
 28 May – Denmark gets a fourth place in Eurovision 2010 in Oslo, Norway.

June

 16 June – Sweden agrees to fund study looking into whether a bridge between Helsingør and Helsingborg would be viable.
 22 June – Parliament overwhelmingly approves the establishment of Anholt Offshore Wind Park, which will supply some 400,000 homes with green energy.
 25 June – According to the Indonesian authorities, Sonata planned to bomb the Danish embassy in revenge for allowing the Mohammed cartoons to be printed in 2005.
 25 June – Denmark loses to Japan in the 2010 FIFA World Cup.
 29 June – Denmark has the highest prices for food and non-alcoholic drinks in the European Union, according to the latest survey from Eurostat.
 30 June – Despite lowering its tax to GDP ratio over the past few years, Denmark still has the EU's highest rate.

July

 13 July – A major European survey reveals that Danish employees are least likely to shirk work.

August

 9 August – Over three million visitors have seen the Little Mermaid statue at Expo 2010, in Shanghai, China.
 12 August – Prime Minister Lars Løkke Rasmussen for the first time puts a date on when Danish troops should be pulled out of Afghanistan: 2015.
 31 August – The Danish-based Kurdish TV station Roj TV faces terror charges for supporting PKK.

September

 3 September – By an overwhelming majority of 45 votes to 3 at the Copenhagen City Council, the construction of a new mosque is pre-approved as part of a new local plan for the city's Amager district.
 10 September – A man is arrested in connection with a bomb at a hotel in Copenhagen.  See Hotel Jørgensen explosion

October

 1 October – About 200 protesters gather outside the Danish Embassy in Paris to demonstrate against what they call 'a massacre' of pilot whales in the Faroe Islands.
 30 October – Danish People's Party proposes a ban on parabolic antennas in public housing.

November
 15 November – The 16th century Danish astronomer Tycho Brahe is exhumed in Prague to clarify the cause of his death, after previous tests showed high levels of mercury in his hair.

December
 29 December – A terrorist plot "to attack Jyllands-Posten and kill an unknown number of people" fails when the accused are arrested.

The arts

Architecture
 26 February – Lene Tranberg is elected to honorary fellowship (Hon. FAIA) by the American Institute of Architects.
 5 November – Bjarke Ingels receives the first ever European Prize for Architecture at a gala dinner in Madrid.

Film
 20 October – Thomas Vinterberg's film Submarino wins the 2010 Nordic Council Film Prize.

Literature
Bjørn Lomborg -  'Smart Solutions to Climate Change, Comparing Costs and Benefits, Cambridge University Press, November 2010, .

Music

Sports
Badminton
 9–14 March – Tine Rasmussen wins gold in Women's Single and Lars Paaske and Jonas Rasmussen win gold in Men's Double at the 2010 All England Super Series.
 14–18 April – With four gold medals, two silver medals and two bronze medals, Denmark finishes as the best nation at the 22nd European Badminton Championships in Manchester, England.
 2328 August Denmark wins two bronze medals at the 2010 BWF World Championships.

Cycling
 24 March – Matti Breschel wins Dwars door Vlaanderen.
 24–28 March – 2010 UCI Track Cycling World Championships talks place in Ballerup Super Arena in Copenhagen 
 25 March – Alex Rasmussen wins gold in men's scratch at the UCI Track Cycling World Championships.
 3 October – Matti Breschel wins silver in men's road race at the UCI Road World Championships in Australia.

Football
 13 May – FC Nordsjælland wins the 2009–10 Danish Cup by defeating FC Midtjylland 2–0 in the final.
 11 June – 11 July – Denmark participates in the FIFA World Cup, but does not make it beyond the group stage after only finishing third in Group E.

Swimming
 	4–15 August  Denmark wins two gold medals, two silver medals and two bronze medals at the 2010 European Aquatics Championships.

Tennis
 1–11 October – Caroline Wozniacki wins China Open.

Other
 24 April – Boxer Mikkel Kessler takes the WBC super-middleweight title from defending champion Carl Froch in an installment of the Super-Six tournament. The match is subsequently deemed "a classic" and "one of the best matches in Danish boxing ever" by the Danish newspaper Ekstra Bladet''.
 13 June – In golf, Thomas Bjørn wins the Portuguese Open on the European Tour.
 5 September – Denmark wins the Team Speedway Junior World Championship final at Rye House Stadium in Hoddesdon, England.

Deaths
 6 January – Jakob Nørhøj, Socialist People's Party politician (b. 1976)
 11 January – Asger Stig Møller, author (b. 1965)
 12 February – Grethe Sønck, actress and singer (born 1929)
 15 February – Rigmor Mydtskov, photographer (b. 1925)
 17 February – Aksel Erhardsen (b. 1927)
 4 March – Etta Cameron, singer (b. 1939)
 3 June – Lars Kjeldgaard, author (b. 1956)
 20 August – Gyda Hansen, actress (b. 1938)
 9 September – Bent Larsen, chess Grandmaster (b. 1935)
 13 October – Ulrik Cold, opera singer (b. 1939)
 19 November – Tobias Faber, architect (b. 1915)
 26 November – Palle Huld, actor and writer (born 1912), inspiration behind the tales of Tintin
 2 December – Kirsten Jacobsen, politician (b. 1942)
 31 December – Tove Maës, actress (born 1921)

See also
2010 in Danish television

References

 
Denmark
Years of the 21st century in Denmark